The First Day of the Rest of Your Life may refer to:
 The First Day of the Rest of Your Life (film), a 2008 French comedy-drama film
 The First Day of the Rest of Your Life (The Walking Dead), an episode of the television series The Walking Dead